Maibam Lokpa Ching or Red Hills is a historical site of World War II, in Nambol, Bishnupur district of Manipur, India. The site is a small hillock, where the war between the British forces and the Japanese forces took place in the WWII. There is a cemetery in the foothills, which houses the tombs of the Japanese soldiers who died in the war.

War museum
A war museum is also built which houses a collection of rare war items and relics including the weapon materials used by the soldiers during the war.

Homage
Every year, many Japanese and British visit the site to pay homage to their ancestors who lost their lives here in the war for their motherland.

References

History of Manipur